Samurai Over Serbia is the second full-length album by Fishtank Ensemble. It was independently released by the band in 2007.  Traditional eastern European, gypsy jazz, klezmer and original tunes are arranged to fit the ensemble’s unconventional, but imaginative sound.  The groups sound is "consistently captivating, as if Gypsy swing continued to swirl around the world, picking up new inflections at every turn."

Track listing
"Saraiman" (traditional, arr. F. Martinez) – 4:09
"Turkish March" (W.A. Mozart, arr. A. Seeman) – 2:59
"Tchavo" (traditional, arr. F. Martinez) – 4:30
"Face the Dragon" (music & arr. by F. Martinez) – 4:06
"Gitanos Californeros" (D. Smolens, arr. Paco de Lucia) – 5:38
"Spirit Prison" (music by D. Smolens, K. Kmetz, lyrics by U. Knudson) – 3:58
"Fraima" (Cesare & GianCarlo dell'Anna, arr. F. Martinez) – 3:45
"Youkali" (Kurt Weill) – 4:52
"Ezraoul" (arr. F. Martinez) – 2:55
"Mehum Mato" (traditional, arr. F. Martinez) – 7:16
"Samurai Over Serbia" (traditional, arr. F. Martinez) – 7:33
"Extremely Large Congenial Romanian" (music and arr. A Seeman) – 2:23
"Yasaburpo Bush" (traditional, arr. M. Penny) – 4:43

Personnel
Fabrice Martinez - violin, violomba
Ursula Knudson - vocals, violin, musical saw, banjolele, percussion
Douglas Smolens (el Douje) - guitar
Aaron Seeman (Duckmandu) - accordion
Djordje Stijepovic - upright bass on tracks 1, 2, 4, 9, 11
Andy Zacharias - upright bass on tracks 3, 5-8, 10, 12
Mike Penny - Tsugaru shamisen, guitar
Kevin Kmetz - additional shamisen tracks on track 4, guitar tracks on track 12

Notes

External links
Samurai Over Serbia at CD Baby
Official Website

2007 albums